Italian anarchism as a movement began primarily from the influence of Mikhail Bakunin, Giuseppe Fanelli, and Errico Malatesta. Rooted in collectivist anarchism and social anarchism, it expanded to include illegalist individualist anarchism, mutualism, anarcho-syndicalism, and especially anarcho-communism. In fact, anarcho-communism first fully formed into its modern strain within the Italian section of the First International. Italian anarchism and anarchists participated in the biennio rosso and survived Italian Fascism. Platformism and insurrectionary anarchism were particularly common in Italian anarchism and continue to influence the movement today. The synthesist Italian Anarchist Federation appeared after the war, and autonomismo and operaismo especially influenced Italian anarchism in the second half of the 20th century.

History

Origins
When the Italian section of the International Workingman's Association was formed in 1869, new and more famous (or infamous) anarchists began appearing on the scene, notable individuals include Carlo Cafiero and Errico Malatesta. Within the Italian section of the IWMA the ideas of anarchist communism as a clear, cohesive movement were formed. At an 1876 conference in Florence, the Italian section of the International Workingman's Association declared the principles of Anarchist-Communism, proclaiming:

It was also in Italy that early Anarchist attempts at revolution began. Bakunin was involved in an insurrection taking place in Florence in 1869 and in the failed 1874 Bologna insurrection. In 1877, Errico Malatesta, Carlo Cafiero, and Costa began an attempt at revolution in Italy with the Banda del Matese. They liberated two villages in Campania before being put down by the military.

Italian Anarchism was first materialized in the Italian section of the First International. The popularity of the IWA skyrocketed with the Paris Commune. Because of limited knowledge of the actual events taking place, many militants had utopian visions of the nature of the Commune, leading to a popularity of Anarchist and other Socialist ideas. The radical republican Giuseppe Mazzini condemned the Commune because it represented everything he hated: class struggle, mass violence, atheism, and materialism. Mazzini's condemnation helped to increase the defection of many republicans to the ranks of the IWA.

As the split between Marx and Bakunin became more prominent, the Italian section of the IWA primarily took the side of Bakunin against the authoritarian behavior of Marx's General Council. Bakunin's defense of the Paris Commune against the attacks of Mazzini and Marx and Engels's incompetence in challenging them led to Bakuninism becoming the prominent strain of thought in the Italian IWA. In 1872, Bakunin, and Cafiero helped to organize a national federation of Italian IWA sections. All the delegates at the founding congress excluding Carlo Terzaghi (a police spy) and two Garibaldian socialists, were Anarchists.

Errico Malatesta 

Errico Malatesta was an important Italian anarchist. He wrote and edited a number of radical newspapers and was also a friend of Mikhail Bakunin. Partly via his enthusiasm for the Paris Commune and partly via his friendship with Carmelo Palladino, he joined the Naples section of the International Workingmen's Association that same year, as well as teaching himself to be a mechanic and electrician. In 1872 he met Mikhail Bakunin, with whom he participated in the International's St. Imier Congress. For the next four years, Malatesta helped spread Internationalist propaganda in Italy; he was imprisoned twice for these activities.

In April 1877, Malatesta, Carlo Cafiero, the Russian Stepniak and about 30 others started an insurrection in the province of Benevento, taking the villages of Letino and Gallo without a struggle. The revolutionaries burned tax registers and declared the end of the King's reign, and were met by enthusiasm: even a local priest showed his support.

In Florence he founded the weekly anarchist paper La Questione Sociale (The Social Question) in which his most popular pamphlet, Fra Contadini (Among Farmers), first appeared. He lived in Buenos Aires from 1885, where he resumed publication of La Questione Sociale, and was involved in the founding of the first militant workers' union in Argentina, the Bakers Union, and left an anarchist impression in the workers' movements there for years to come.

Returning to Europe in 1889, he published a newspaper called L'Associazione in Nice until he was forced to flee to London. During this time he wrote several important pamphlets, including L'Anarchia. Malatesta then took part in the International Anarchist Congress of Amsterdam (1907), where he debated in particular with Pierre Monatte on the relation between anarchism and syndicalism (or trade-unionism).

After the First World War, Malatesta eventually returned to Italy for the final time. Two years after his return, in 1921, the Italian government imprisoned him, again, although he was released two months before the fascists came to power. From 1924 until 1926, when Benito Mussolini silenced all independent press, Malatesta published the journal Pensiero e Volontà, although he was harassed and the journal suffered from government censorship. He was to spend his remaining years leading a relatively quiet life, earning a living as an electrician. After years of suffering from a weak respiratory system and regular bronchial attacks, he developed bronchial pneumonia from which he died after a few weeks, despite being given 1500 litres of oxygen in his last five hours. He died on Friday, 22 July 1932.

The Socialist Revolutionary Anarchist Party 

The Socialist Revolutionary Anarchist Party was a short-lived Italian political party.

Founded in January 1891 at the Capolago congress, at which around 80 delegates from Italian socialist and anarchist groups participated. Notable figures included, Errico Malatesta, Luigi Galleani, Amilcare Cipriani, Andrea Costa and Filippo Turati.  Malatesta envisioned the PSAR as the Italian federation of a new, anarchist and socialist, International Workingmen's Association.

The founding of Unione Sindacale Italiana 

Unione Sindacale Italiana is an Italian trade union that was founded in 1912, after a group of workers, previously affiliated with the Confederazione Generale del Lavoro (CGI), met in Modena and declared themselves linked to the legacy of the First International, and later joined the anarcho-syndicalist International Workers' Association (IWA; Associazione Internazionale dei Lavoratori in Italian or AIT – Asociación Internacional de los Trabajadores in the common Spanish reference).

The most left-wing camere del lavoro adhered in rapid succession to the USI, and it engaged in all major political battles for labor rights – without ever adopting the militarist attitudes present with other trade unions. Nonetheless, after the outbreak of World War I, USI was shaken by the dispute around the issue of Italy's intervention in the conflict on the Entente Powers' side. The problem was made acute by the presence of eminent pro-intervention, national-syndicalist voices inside the body: Alceste De Ambris, Filippo Corridoni, and, initially, Giuseppe Di Vittorio. The union managed to maintain its opposition to militarism, under the leadership of Armando Borghi and Alberto Meschi.

The Unione Anarchica Italiana and the biennio rosso
In the Italian events known as the biennio rosso the anarcho-syndicalist trade union Unione Sindacale Italiana "grew to 800,000 members and the influence of the Italian Anarchist Union (20,000 members plus Umanita Nova, its daily paper) grew accordingly...Anarchists were the first to suggest occupying workplaces."

Individualist anarchism

Renzo Novatore was an important individualist anarchist who collaborated in numerous anarchist journals and participated in futurism avant-garde currents. Novatore collaborated in the individualist anarchist journal Iconoclasta! alongside the young stirnerist illegalist Bruno Filippi Novatore belonged to the leftist section of the avant-garde movement of Futurism alongside other individualist anarcho-futurists such as Dante Carnesecchi, Leda Rafanelli, Auro d'Arcola, and Giovanni Governato.

Pietro Bruzzi published the journal L'Individualista in the 1920s alongside Ugo Fedeli and Francesco Ghezzi but who fell to fascist forces later. Pietro Bruzzi also collaborated with the Italian American individualist anarchist publication Eresia of New York City edited by Enrico Arrigoni.

The Fascist regime and afterwards 
When the war ended, USI peaked in numbers (it was during this time that it joined the IWA, becoming known as the USI-AIT). It became a major opponent of Benito Mussolini and the Fascist regime, fighting street battles with the Blackshirts – culminating in the August 1922 riots of Parma, when the USI-AIT faced Italo Balbo and his Arditi.

USI-AIT was outlawed by Mussolini in 1926, but resumed its activities in clandestinity and exile. It fought against Francisco Franco in the Spanish Civil War, alongside the Confederación Nacional del Trabajo and Federación Anarquista Ibérica, and took part in the Spanish Revolution. After World War II and the proclamation of the Republic, former members of the union followed the guidelines of the Federazione Anarchica Italiana that called for the creation of a unitary movement, and joined the Confederazione Generale Italiana del Lavoro (CGIL).

The prominent Italian anarchist Camillo Berneri, who volunteered to fight against Franco was killed instead in Spain by gunmen associated with the Communist Party of Spain.

Postwar years and today

In the immediate postwar years there existed failed attempts at a resurgence of anarchosyndicalism. The Italian Anarchist Federation was founded in 1945 in Carrara. It adopted an "Associative Pact" and the "Anarchist Program" of Errico Malatesta. It decided to publish the weekly Umanità Nova retaking the name of the journal published by Errico Malatesta.

Inside the FAI a tendency grouped as (GAAP – Anarchist Groups of Proletarian Action) led by Pier Carlo Masini was founded which "proposed a Libertarian Party with an anarchist theory and practice adapted to the new economic, political and social reality of post-war Italy, with an internationalist outlook and effective presence in the workplaces...The GAAP allied themselves with a similar development within the French Anarchist movement, the Federation Communiste Libertaire, whose leading light was Georges Fontenis."

Another tendency which didn't identify either with the more classical FAI or with the GAAP started to emerge as local groups. These groups emphasized direct action, informal affinity groups and expropriation for financing anarchist activity. From within these groups the influential insurrectionary anarchist Alfredo Maria Bonanno will emerge influenced by the practice of the Spanish exiled anarchist Josep Lluís i Facerias.

In the IX Congress of the Italian Anarchist Federation in Carrara, 1965 a group decided to split off from this organization and creates the Gruppi di Iniziativa Anarchica which was mostly composed of individualist anarchists who disagreed with important aspects of the "Associative Pact" and was critical of anarcho-syndicalism. The GIA published the bi-weekly L'Internazionale. Another group split off from the Anarchist Federation and regrouped as Gruppi Anarchici Federati. The GAF later starts publishing Interrogations and A Rivista Anarchica.

In the late sixties a new generation of young people created various informal anarchist groups and projects outside of the original formal organizations of the Italian Anarchist Federation and the Unione Sindacale Italiana. On 12 December 1969, a bomb went off at the Piazza Fontana in Milan that killed 17 people and injured 88. Giuseppe Pinelli, an Italian railroad worker and anarchist, was picked up, along with other anarchists, for questioning regarding the attack. Just before midnight on 15 December 1969, Pinelli was seen to fall to his death from a fourth floor window of the Milan police station. Most commentators now agree the bomb was placed by neofascist activists as part of a plot inspired by sections of the secret services. Later, in the Years of Lead, the trend of anarchism was violently repressed, while it survived throughout and continued to exist.

In the early seventies a platformist tendency emerged within the Italian Anarchist Federation which argued for more strategic coherence and social insertion in the workers movement while rejecting the synthesist "Associative Pact" of Malatesta which the FAI adhered to. These groups started organizing themselves outside the FAI in organizations such as O.R.A. from Liguria which organized a Congress attended by 250 delegates of grupos from 60 locations. This movement was influential in the autonomia movements of the seventies. They published Fronte Libertario della lotta di classe in Bologna and Comunismo libertario from Modena.

Another group tended to emphasize anarcho-syndicalism and published Per l'Azione Diretta from Florence and Bolletino d'Informazione Anarcosindicalista. The Federation of Anarchist Communists (Federazione dei Comunisti Anarchici), or FdCA, was established in 1985 in Italy from the fusion of the Organizzazione Rivoluzionaria Anarchica (Revolutionary Anarchist Organisation) and the Unione dei Comunisti Anarchici della Toscana (Tuscan Union of Anarchist Communists). In 1986, the Congress of ORA/UCAT adopted the name Federation of Anarchist Communists.

The synthesist Italian Anarchist Federation and the platformist Federation of Anarchist Communists continue existing today but insurrectionary anarchism continues to be relevant as the recent establishment of the Informal Anarchist Federation shows.

Timeline 
 1865 Foundation of the International Revolutionary Brotherhood.
 1869 Foundation of the Italian section of the International Workingman's Association.
 1876 – The red-and-black flag was first used by the Italian section of the First International.
 1891: Foundation of the Socialist Revolutionary Anarchist Party.
 1900: The Anarchist Gaetano Bresci assassinates King Umberto I of Italy.
 1912: Foundation of the Unione Sindacale Italiana trade-union (joined the International Workers' Association founded in 1922).
 1918: Beginning of the Italian Factory Occupations known as biennio rosso.
 1920: Publication of the newspaper Umanità Nova (New Humanity).
 1920: Founding of the Unione Anarchica Italiana.
 1936–1939: Sébastien Faure Century, contingent of the Durruti Column in the Spanish Civil War.
 1945: Establishment of the Italian Anarchist Federation.
 1986: Foundation in Italy of the Federation of Anarchist Communists.
 2003: Foundation of the Informal Anarchist Federation.

See also 
 Autonomism
 Accidental Death of an Anarchist
 European individualist anarchism#Italy
 Fasci Siciliani
 Federazione Anarchica Italiana
 Federation of Anarchist Communists
 Socialism in Italy

Footnotes

Further reading

 
 Kenyon Zimmer, Immigrants Against the State: Yiddish and Italian Anarchism in America. Urbana, IL: University of Illinois Press, 2015.

External links 
 Anarchy in Italy
 
 Italian anarchists outside Italy at the Kate Sharpley Library
 Anarchism in Italy at the Kate Sharpley Library

 
Modern history of Italy
Italy